Ivan Puluj (son of Pavlo Puluj and Xenia née Burshtynsky , ; ; 2 February 1845 – 31 January 1918) was an Ukrainian physicist and inventor, who has been championed as an early developer of the use of X-rays for medical imaging. His contributions were largely neglected until the end of the 20th century.

Biography
Ivan Puluj graduated with honors from Theological Faculty of the University of Vienna (1869), later also from the Department of Philosophy (1872). In 1876 Pului finished his doctorate on internal friction in gases at the University of Strasbourg under supervision of August Kundt. Puluj taught at the Navy academy in Fiume (Rijeka, Croatia) (1874–1876), University of Vienna (1874–1884) and the German part of the Higher Technical School in Prague (1884–1916). He served as the rector of the Higher Technical School in Prague (German part) in 1888–1889. Puluj also worked as a state adviser on electrical engineering for Bohemian and Moravian local governments.

In addition, he completed a translation of the Bible into the Ukrainian language.

Personal life
4 October 1884, he married Kateřina née Stožicky (1863–1945) in Vienna. They had six children: Natalia (wife of the composer Vasyl Barvinsky), Olga, Maria Xenia Margareta (died in Vienna in 1974), Alexander Hans (1901–1984), Pavlo (died in 1986) and Georg (1906–1987).

Scientific contribution

Puluj did heavy research into cathode rays, publishing several papers about those rays between 1880 and 1882. In 1881 as a result of experiments into what he called cold light Prof. Puluj developed the Puluj lamp. Puluj experimented with his new device and published his results in a scientific paper, Luminous Electrical Matter and the Fourth State of Matter in  the Notes of the Austrian Imperial Academy of Sciences (1880–1883), but expressed his ideas in an obscure manner using obsolete terminology. Puluj did gain some recognition when the work was translated and published as a book by the Royal Society in the UK.

While Puluj's finding were essentially X-rays, he reported his results 6 weeks after Wilhelm Conrad Röntgen published his,
and can not be credited with the discovery of X-rays.

Puluj made many other discoveries as well. He is particularly noted for inventing a device for determining the mechanical equivalent of heat that was exhibited at the Exposition Universelle, Paris, 1878. Puluj also participated in opening of several power plants in Austria-Hungary.

Quotes about Puluj 
 "World history has never been just to certain individuals or certain nations. Small nations and their achievements are often neglected, while the accomplishments of large nations are at times exaggerated."
 Slavko Bokshan, a Serbian scientist who worked in the same department as Puluj and Röntgen

Honours
 Ukraine's Ternopil Ivan Pul'uj National Technical University is named after him.
 A stamp published on the occasion of Puluj's 150th Birth Anniversary in 1995.
 Streets in Kyiv, Lviv and other Ukrainian cities have the name of Ivan Puluj.

Pulyui's publications and first images (1895)
  I. – 1880. – 81. – pp. 864–923; II. – 1881. – 83. – pp. 402–420; III. 1881. – 83. – pp. 693–708; IV. – 1882. – 85. – pp. 871–881.
 , 1883.
 Radiant Elektrode Matter and the so Called Fourth State. -London: Physical Memoirs, 1889. – Vol. l, Pt.2. – pp. 233–331.
  Abt. 1896. – 105. – pp. 228–238.

Select works
 Puluj, H. J. (1875). On a lecture-room apparatus for the determination of the mechanical equivalent of heat. Taylor and Francis.
 Puluj, J., Pulyui, I., Пулюй, И. П., & Пулюй, І. П. (1876). Über die Abhängigkeit der Reibung der Gase von der Temperatur.  (About the dependence of the friction of the gases on the temperature).
 Puluj, J. (1876). Ueber einen Schulapparat zur Bestimmung des mechanischen Wärmeaequivalentes. Annalen der Physik. 233(3): 437–446. (Over a school apparatus for determining the mechanical Wärmeaequivalentes).
 Puluj, J. (1876). Beitrag zur Bestimmung des mechanischen Wärmeaequivalentes. Annalen der Physik. 233(4): 649–656. (Contribution to the determination of the mechanical Wärmeaequivalentes).
 Puluj, J. (1877). Ueber die Abhängigkeit der Reibung der Gase von der Temperatur. Annalen der Physik. 237(6): 296–310.
 Puluj, J. (1877). On the diffusion of vapours through clay cells. Taylor and Francis.
 Puluj, J. (1878). On the friction of vapours. Taylor and Francis.
 Puluj, J. (1879). On the radiometer. Taylor and Francis.
 Crookes, W., & Puluj, J. (1880). Annalen der Physik. Phil. Trans. 1: 152–3879. (Annals of Physics).
 Puluj, J., & Glaser, G. (1880). The Fourth State of Matter. A Refutation. Science. 58–59.
 Puluj, J. (1880). Strahlende Elektrodenmaterie. ©Akademie d. Wissenschaften Wien, 864–923.
http://www.zobodat.at/pdf/SBAWW_81_2_0864-0923.pdf
 Puluj, J. (1883). Strahlende Elektroden-Materie und der sogenannte vierte Aggregatzustand. (Radiant electrode material and the so-called fourth state).
 Puluj, J. (1887). Objective Darstellung der wahren Gestalt einer schwingenden Saite. Annalen der Physik: 267(8): 1033–1035. (Objective presentation of the true form of a vibrating string).
 Puluj, J. (1888). Apparatus for illustrating the fall of bodies in a vacuum. Taylor and Francis.
 Puluj, J. (1888). Fallapparat. Annalen der Physik. 269(3): 575–576.
 Puluj, J. (1890). On a telethermometer. Taylor and Francis.
 Puluj, H. (1895). On Kathode Rays. Proceedings of the Physical Society of London. 14(1): 178.

Support of Ukrainian culture

Puluj is also known for his contribution in promoting Ukrainian culture. He actively supported opening of a Ukrainian university in Lviv and published articles to support Ukrainian language. Together with P. Kulish and I. Nechuy-Levytsky he translated Gospels and Psalter into Ukrainian. Being a professor, Puluj organized scholarships for Ukrainian students in Austria-Hungary.

The World Association of Roentgenologists was created in 2018 in Lviv city in honor of Ivan Puluj.

References

Literature 
 R. Gajda, R. Plazko: Johann Puluj: Rätsel des universalen Talents. EuroWelt-Verlag, Lwiw 2001, 
 S. Nahorniak, M. Medyukh: Physical-technical ideas of Ivan Pul'uj. Dschura, Ternopil 1999,

External links 

 Ternopil Ivan Puluj National Technical University
 The Discovery or X-Rays
 Puluj-Roehrer lamp
 The Cathode Ray Tube site

1845 births
1918 deaths
19th-century Ukrainian physicists
20th-century Ukrainian physicists
20th-century Austrian  physicists
19th-century Austrian physicists
Ukrainian inventors
Ukrainian translators
Translators of the Bible into Ukrainian
Ukrainian Austro-Hungarians
Austro-Hungarian inventors
People from Ternopil Oblast
People from the Kingdom of Galicia and Lodomeria
Academic staff of Czech Technical University in Prague
Austrian scientific instrument makers
X-ray pioneers
Cathode ray tube
20th-century translators
19th-century translators